Charles Eugene Hall III (born May 30, 1973) is a contemporary worship music leader and songwriter from Oklahoma City, Oklahoma. He is a member of a group of musicians and speakers that collectively form the Passion movement.

Career
Hall is a pastor of worship arts and liturgy at Frontline Church in Oklahoma City, Oklahoma.

Hall's band, in which he performs vocals and guitar, consists of Ben Freeman (electric guitar and keyboards), Dustin Ragland (drums), and Quint Anderson (bass synth).

Discography
 Don't Pass Us By (as "Nathan & Charlie") (1994)
 Holy Roar (as "Sons & Daughters") (1996)
 Joel's Window (1997)
 Thought (1998)
 Porch and Altar (2001)
 On the Road to Beautiful (2003)
 Live Roots (2004)
 September Through November (2005)
 Flying into Daybreak (2006)
 The Bright Sadness (2008)
 The Rising (2010)
 The Death of Death (2013)

Passion event albums
 Our Soul's Desire (1997)
 Live Worship from the 268 Generation (1998)
 Better Is One Day (1999)
 One Day: Live (2000)
 The Road To One Day (2000)
 Our Love Is Loud (2002)
 Sacred Revolution (2003)
 Hymns Ancient and Modern (2004)
 How Great Is Our God (2005)
 Everything Glorious (2006)
 God of This City (2008)
 Awakening (2010)
 Here for You (2011)
 White Flag (2012)
 Let the Future Begin (2013)

Awards
GMA Dove Awards
2007: Everything Glorious – Special Event Album of the Year

References

External links
 

1979 births
Living people
Oklahoma Baptist University alumni
American Pentecostals
American performers of Christian music
Christian music songwriters
Performers of contemporary worship music
Sixstepsrecords artists